H. africana may refer to:
 Haplocoelopsis africana, a plant species found in Kenya, Tanzania and possibly Angola
 Hydnora africana, an achlorophyllous plant native to southern Africa parasitic on the roots of members of the Euphorbiaceae

See also
 Africana (disambiguation)